Sree Buddha College of Engineering is a self-financing engineering college under Sree Buddha Foundation, Kollam. This college is located in Elavumthitta of Pathanamthitta District and is affiliated to APJ Abdul Kalam Kerala Technological University. Sree Buddha College of Engineering, Pattoor (Alapuzha District), Sree Buddha Central School, Karunagappally and Sree Buddha Central School, Pattoor are some of the Centres of Excellence Associated by the Foundation. Currently, there are four engineering streams in this college: Electrical and electronics engineering, Civil Engineering, Computer Science, Mechanical Engineering & Electronics and Communication Engineering.

Courses 
 B.Tech
 M.Tech

B.Tech 
 Electronics and Communication Engineering (ECE)
 Computer Science and Engineering (CSE)
 Civil Engineering (CE)
 Electrical and Electronics Engineering (EEE)
 Mechanical Engineering (ME)

M.Tech 
 Communication Engineering (ECE)
 Computer Science and Engineering (CSE)
 Computer Aided Structural Engineering (Civil)

References

External links

Engineering colleges in Kerala
Universities and colleges in Pathanamthitta district
Educational institutions in India with year of establishment missing